Soda pop is a U.S. regional term for a soft drink that’s sweetened and carbonated. 

Soda pop may also refer to: 
 Soda pop (confectionery), a confectionery product
 Sodapop Curtis, a character in the novel The Outsiders by S. E. Hinton
 "Soda Pop", a song by Britney Spears from her 1999 album ...Baby One More Time
 "Soda Pop", a song by Robbie Williams featuring Michael Bublé from Williams' 2013 album Swings Both Ways
 Soda Pop, the English translation of the Swedish children's classic Loranga, Masarin och Dartanjang

See also
 Soda Popinski, a character from the Punch-Out!! series of video games
 Soda Poppa, a 1931 short animated film
 Soda Poppers, a group of characters from the video game Sam & Max Save the World
Sodapoppin (born 1994), an American Twitch streamer